The 2002 Seattle Bowl was the second and final edition of the college football bowl game (known for the previous 3 years as the Oahu Bowl, before moving to Seattle), and was played at Seahawks Stadium in Seattle, Washington. The game pitted the University of Oregon Ducks from the Pac-10 and the Wake Forest University Demon Deacons from the ACC. The game was the final competition of the 2002 football season for each team and resulted in a 38–17 Wake Forest victory.

Game summary

References

Seattle Bowl
Seattle Bowl
Oregon Ducks football bowl games
Wake Forest Demon Deacons football bowl games
Seattle Bowl
December 2002 sports events in the United States